David Van Horne (born August 25, 1939) is a retired Major League Baseball announcer.

Van Horne had been the lead play-by-play announcer for the Miami Marlins Radio Network since 2001; prior to that, he spent 32 years of his broadcasting career with the Montreal Expos, 14 of those years partnered with Duke Snider.

Early career
Van Horne attended and graduated from Wilson Area High School in Easton, Pennsylvania in 1957. Van Horne entered the drama department at the Richmond Professional Institute in Richmond, Virginia. While at the school he began hosting a Top 40 program at a local radio station, which led to his dropping out of school and starting a full-time broadcasting career in Roanoke, where he began calling high school football and basketball. This led in turn to Van Horne calling baseball for the Richmond Braves, the Class AAA affiliate of the Atlanta Braves, beginning in 1966. He was hired by the Montreal Expos for their inaugural season in 1969.

Montreal Expos (1969–2000)
Van Horne is well known for his "El Presidente, El Perfecto!" call, made when Montreal Expos pitcher Dennis Martínez completed his perfect game against the Los Angeles Dodgers on July 28, 1991. With the Expos, his sign-in phrase "Thanks Duke and hi again, everybody. Glad to have you aboard for today's game...", and home run call "up, up and away" projected his enthusiasm and excitement.

In 2000, as the Expos had not secured an English radio or television contract, Van Horne broadcast the season over the Internet.
With the Expos broadcast situation still unsettled for the 2001 season, Van Horne left at the end of 2000 to broadcast for the Marlins.

Florida/Miami Marlins (2001–2021)
Beginning in 2001, Van Horne broadcast games for the Marlins. During his time in Florida, he called the 2003 World Series championship.

Van Horne broadcast the last Expos home game in Montreal from the Marlins' broadcast booth on September 29, 2004—a 9–1 win for Florida. After the game was over, Van Horne joined the Expos television crew for a special post-game show.

In January 2022, Van Horne officially announced his retirement from broadcasting.

Awards and honors
Van Horne was named the 1996 recipient of the Jack Graney Award by the Canadian Baseball Hall of Fame for "A lifetime of media achievement". He was inducted into the Canadian Baseball Hall of Fame on June 21, 2014, along with former Montreal Expos general manager Murray Cook and third baseman Tim Wallach.

Van Horne is the 2011 recipient of the Ford C. Frick Award from the National Baseball Hall of Fame.
He received the award on July 23, 2011 in Cooperstown, New York.

References

External links
 Dave Van Horne Ford C. Frick Award biography at the National Baseball Hall of Fame
 Montreal newspaper interview on memories of Expos
 Ottawa Sun article on the final Expos home series

1939 births
Living people
American expatriate baseball people in Canada
American radio sports announcers
Canadian Baseball Hall of Fame inductees
Ford C. Frick Award recipients
Major League Baseball broadcasters
Miami Marlins announcers
Minor League Baseball broadcasters
Montreal Expos announcers
People from Easton, Pennsylvania
Virginia Commonwealth University alumni
Wilson Area High School alumni